The American Samoa House of Representatives is the lower house of the American Samoa Fono. The House consists of 21 members serving two-year terms, with 20 popularly elected representatives, and one delegate from Swains Island elected in a public meeting.

History
American Samoa became a United States territory in 1900 and was initially administered by the Navy. From 1905, annual meetings were held with delegates sent from the local communities, as an advisory council to the naval governor.

In 1948, a bicameral legislature was established, still in advisory capacity. The lower house, named the House of Representatives, was composed of 54 members: 52 (one from each village) were elected in open meetings according to Samoan custom, and two were elected by secret ballot by residents not living under the matai system. The first session of the legislature was called to order by Attorney General John D. Maroney at 9:30 am on 26 October 1948, and high orator Mariota Tiumalu Tuiasosopo was unanimously elected as the Speaker of the House of Representatives.

The legislature was reformed in 1952, after administration of American Samoa had been transferred to the Department of the Interior. The number of representatives was reduced to 18, all elected by secret ballot: five from each of the three districts of American Samoa (Western, Eastern and Manu‘a), one from Swains Island, and two elected by residents not living under the matai system.

In 1960, the first constitution of American Samoa was adopted. The House of Representatives remained with 18 members, but under a slightly different composition: one from each of three districts in Ma‘oputasi county, one from each of two districts in Lealataua/Fofo county, and one from each of the then remaining 12 counties, all elected by secret ballot for two-year terms; and one non-voting delegate from Swains Island, elected in an open meeting, also for a two-year term.

In 1967, the revised constitution modified the composition to 21 members: two from the combined counties of Ta‘ū island, one from the combined counties of Ofu-Olosega, one from each of five districts in Ma‘oputasi county, one from each of two districts in Sua county, two each from Itu‘au and Tualauta counties, and one from each of the six remaining counties, all elected by secret ballot for two-year terms; and one non-voting delegate from Swains Island, elected in an open meeting, also for a two-year term.

List of members

Past composition of the House of Representatives

See also
 List of speakers of the American Samoa House of Representatives
Members of the American Samoa House of Representatives

References

House of Representatives
Territorial lower houses in the United States